Anne McKenzie (July 28, 1925 in Ceres, Cape Province, South Africa - July 23, 2014) was a South African Masters athlete pioneer, setting several world records as early as the 1960s.  She continued setting records, not only on the track but in road bicycle events as well.  She had been the South African national champion in the 800 metres from its inception in 1963 for four straight years until 1966.

References

South African female middle-distance runners
1925 births
2014 deaths
South African masters athletes
World record holders in masters athletics
People from Ceres, Western Cape
Sportspeople from the Western Cape